Van Royen or Van Roijen is a Dutch toponymic surname. "Rooij" or "Roij" was a local term for many towns ending with "rode" or "roij", like Nistelrode, Sint-Oedenrode, Stramproy and Wanroij. This suffix itself means "a clearing made by men". Notable people with the surname include:

 Adriaan van Royen (1704–1779), Dutch physician and botanist
 Heleen van Royen (born 1965), Dutch novelist and columnist
 Herman van Roijen (1905–1991), Dutch diplomat and politician, Minister of Foreign Affairs in 1946
 Marjon van Royen (born 1957), Dutch journalist and foreign news correspondent
 Willem Hendrik Wilhelmus van Royen (1672–1742), Dutch game still life and animal genre painter
 Willem Frederiksz van Royen (c.1645–1723), Dutch still life and flower painter

Snel van Royen
 Rudolph Snel van Royen (1546–1613), Dutch linguist and mathematician
 Willebrord Snel van Royen (1580–1626), Dutch astronomer and mathematician, son of Rudolph

See also
 Van Rooyen and Van Rooij, surnames of the same origin

References

Dutch-language surnames
Toponymic surnames